The T-72 is a Soviet-designed main battle tank that entered production in 1971. It replaced the T-54/55 series as the workhorse of Soviet tank forces (while the T-64 and T-80 served as the Soviet high-technology tanks).  In front-line Russian service, T-72s are being upgraded or augmented by the T-90 (itself, a modernized version of the T-72B). The T-72 has been exported and produced in many countries.

Operators

Current operators
  – 500 T-72, T-72M, T-72M1 and T-72AG
  – 44 T-72M1 bought from Belarus in 1999
  – 84 T-72B
  – ~572 T-72A, T-72B and T-72 SIM2
  – 446 T-72B in service. Various T-72 modifications in reserve.
  – 160 T-72M2 and a large number (some 250) in reserve.
  - 1 operated by the 4 Intelligence Company
  – 30 modernized T-72M4CZ and 20 T-72M1 in service. 66 T-72M1 in reserve as of 1 January 2016. More than 40 T-72s were donated to Ukraine in 2022.
  – 100 T-72AV delivered by Ukraine in 2010.
  – 50 bought from Yemen, 171 T-72UA1 vehicles reportedly ordered from Ukraine in 2011.
 Tigray Defense Forces
  –143 T-72B/SIM1 in 2018. Upgraded T-72 SIMs were upgraded in Georgia with assistance of Israel.
  – 34 T-72M and T-72M1 in active service. 130 in reserve as of 2018. 77 T-72s were donated to the new Iraqi Army. Hungary announced it ordered 44 Leopard 2A7+ tanks from Germany, which are to replace the T-72 in the 2020s.
  – 1,900 T-72M and T-72M1 as of 2008
  – 480-540 T-72S and 140-300 T-72M1 as of 2021. Licensed production still underway as seen in Iranian factories. Numerous upgraded models. Many T-72M's upgraded to Rakhsh standard.
  – 1,000 T-72 Ural (1973), T-72 Ural modernization, T-72M, T-72M1 and Saddam tanks were in service with Iraqi Army in 1990. 375 T-72 Ural (1973), T-72 Ural modernization, T-72M, T-72M1, Lion of Babylon and Saddam tanks were in service with Iraqi Regular Army in 2003. Only 125 T-72M1 are in service as of 2009 with the new Iraqi Army. Some T-72S MBTs in service with the PMF. Some T-72s have been upgraded and modernized by Iran with Rakhsh kits.
  – 300
  – 77 T-72AV from Ukraine in 2007. 33 delivered in Feb 2009 may bring total to 110.
  – 215
  – T-72B1
  – 150 in 2003
  – 48 PT-91M delivered by Poland (improved Polish PT-91, which is itself an improved variant of the T-72M1)
  – 162: 136 T-72B and 12 T-72BK from Belarus delivered in two shipments, first in 1999 and the second in 2000, 14 T-72M were delivered in 2021 from the Czech Republic.
  – 100
  – 139 T-72S.
  – 50 T-72B1MS tanks.
  – 77+ T-72M1 maybe in larger numbers.
  - Unknown quantity. The DPRK allegedly purchased a number of T-72 and its parts from various countries after being rejected an order of T-90 tanks.
  – 30 T-72A and 1 T-72AK delivered from Ukraine in 1999. Unspecified amount returned to Ukraine after their handover in July 2022.
  – 382 T-72M1, T-72M1D and T-72M1R in active service as of 2020. 2008 – 586  2006, 2007 – 597, 2005 – 644, 2004 – 649 and 135 T-72M1Z (T-72M1 upgraded to PT-91 standard). Also 232 PT-91 in service. More than 260 T-72s have been donated to Ukraine in 2022.
  – 850 T-72B3, 550 T-72B3M, and 630 T-72B are in operation in 2022. 270 T-72B3 received in 2013. Additional 143 T-72B3 were delivered as of October 2014. 300 were delivered during the year. Planned to continue purchases. 596 were upgraded to T-72B3 before 2015, more than 70 in 2015. 30 more as of May 2016. About 1000 tanks have been modernized as of September 2016, +300 (>1,300 up to 2017). 40 tanks were delivered in September 2016. +154 T-72B3M in 2017. 2,030 T-72 active, 8,000 in reserve in 2020. Deliveries and orders of modernized T-72B3Ms continue through 2022 even despite economic sanctions due to the invasion in Ukraine.
  – 20 T-72M1, still in service at the end of 2018. Another 10 in storage.
  – 30 T-72B1MS and 64 T-72M in reserve
  – 96–101 units delivered in two shipments from Ukraine: first, 32 T-72 on the MV Faina in 2009, and second, 67 T-72 in 20??. 2 T-72 tanks were destroyed during the Heglig Crisis.
  – 400 T-72AV, of which 250 were bought from Ukraine and Belarus. Most of them are second-hand, the rest are produced locally under license at Military Industry Corporation. An additional 170 surplus T-72 were ordered on 20 September 2016.
  – 1,600
  – 44
  – 702
  – 50 T-72B.
  – 603, during the years prior to the War in Donbas (2014–2022) they were being retired in favor of T-64. Many have been restored to active service since then, captured during the 2022 Russian invasion of Ukraine, and others were donated by former Warsaw Pact NATO members.
• Russian separatist forces in Donbas
  – 70 T-72B
  – 92 T-72B1, delivered in 2009–2012 from Russia. In June 2012, Russia and Venezuela agreed on deal for 100 more T-72.
  – 39 in 2003.

Evaluation / aggressor training

  – 1 donated by Germany to Australian Army for evaluation
  – Former East German tanks received at the end of the Cold War for OPFOR training. Out of service by 2000.
  – Some transferred from Iraq to Pakistan after the Persian Gulf War.
  – Used for aggressor training. Its presence was considered classified but released into public after army's invitation events.
  – Acquired 8 former East German T-72s in 1991 primarily to evaluate Soviet armour. One has been preserved, while others are used as targets.
  – 90
  - 1 obtained from the exchange of industrial machinery in Romania for scientific research, which is called "Type 64".

Former operators 

  – About 1,700 T-72/T-72M/T-72M1s were produced between 1981 and 1990. The Czechoslovak army had 815 T-72s in 1991. All were passed on to the successor states in 1993:
a)  – 543
b)  – 272
  – 35 T-72s (from USSR), 219 T-72s (from Poland and Czechoslovakia), 31 T-72Ms (from USSR), 162 T-72Ms (from Poland and Czechoslovakia) and 136 T-72M1s. 75 T-72s were fitted with additional hull armour. Passed on to the unified German state
a)  – 549 tanks taken from the GDR's army, all scrapped, sold to other countries or given to museums.
  – Some 160–170 T-72M1s. About 70 T-72M1s (one armoured brigade) were bought from the Soviet Union and were delivered in 1984, 1985–1988 and 1990. A further 97 T-72M1s (including a small number of command versions T-72M1K and T-72M1K1) were bought from German surplus stocks in 1992–1994. All withdrawn from service in 2006. Scrapped in Jyväskylä or sold as spares to the Czech Republic. At least two Finnish T-72s are still in working order and have been used in showcases.
  – Several were captured from the Syrian Army.
  – 30 T-72M1s were bought in 1986 from Israel and delivered in 1987. Withdrawn from service (in long-term storage), 28 tanks are for sale (23 of them need repairs and five are operational). In 2022 it was reported that Romania transferred their fleet of T-72s to Ukraine in response to the 2022 Russian invasion of Ukraine.
  – In 1994 Sierra Leone acquired two T-72s from Poland via Ukraine (the vehicles were previously in Polish service). Another unspecified number of ex-Polish tanks was delivered to Sierra Leone in 1997 also via Ukraine (these vehicles also previously served with Poland).
  – Passed on to successor states:
a)  – 10,284
b)  – 1,797
c)  – 1,044
d)  – 702
e)  – 700
f)  – 325
g)  – 246
h)  – 219
i)  – 150
j)  – 70
k)  – 44
l)  – 398, all units transferred to Russia in 1993
m)  – 114, all units transferred to Russia in 1994
n)  – 0, no Soviet divisions stationed in Moldova fielded T-72s
  – Bought approximately 18 T-72Ms from the USSR and 72 from Czechoslovakia, later developed the improved M-84.

Variants

Soviet Union and Russia

The T-72 was designed and first built in the Soviet Union.

 T-72 "Ural" (Ob'yekt 172M) (1973): Original version, armed with the 125 mm D-81TM smoothbore tank gun. Unlike the later versions it had the searchlight mounted on left. It also had flipper-type armour panels. It had the TPD-2-49 coincidence rangefinder optical sight protruding from its turret.
T-72K: Command version of the T-72 "Ural" with an additional R-130M radio. Company command versions were fitted with two additional R-123M/R-173 radios and also carried a 10 m telescopic mast. Battalion and regiment command versions were fitted with two additional R-123M/R-173 radios and the R-130M that used the 10 m mast when it was erected. In NATO code, the T-72K was represented by three different designations: T-72K1, T-72K2 and T-72K3 which represented the company command version, battalion command version and regiment command version.
 Robot-2: Remote controlled T-72 "Ural".
 Ob'yekt 172-2M "Buffalo": Modernization of the T-72 made in the early 1970s.
 T-72 "Ural-1" (Ob'yekt 172M1) (1976): new 2A46 main gun, new armour on the turret.
 T-72V: ("V" for vzryvnoi – explosive) unofficial designation for tanks fitted with Kontakt-1 explosive reactive armour fitted to the hull front and turret.
 T-72A (Ob'yekt 176) (1979): An improved version of the basic T-72 "Ural". Large numbers of early-production T-72 "Ural" models were modernized in the 1980s. Searchlight has been placed on the right-hand side of turret, blanking off the TPD-2-49 coincidence optical rangefinder and replaced by the TPD-K1 laser rangefinder, added plastic armour track skirts covering the upper part of the suspension with separate panels protecting the sides of the fuel and stowage panniers instead of the flipper-type armor panels used on the T-72 "Ural", the turret front and top being heavily reinforced with composite armour better known by its US codename – "Dolly Parton", provisions for mounting reactive armor, an electronic fire control system, MB smoke grenade launchers, flipper armour mount on front mudguards, internal changes, and a slight weight increase.

T-72A obr.1979g: Additional glacis armour with thickness of 17 mm of high resistance steel.
 T-72A obr.1984g: Late-production model with anti-radiation lining.
 T-72AK (Ob'yekt 176K): Command version of the T-72A. In NATO code T-72AK was represented by three different designations: T-72AK1, T-72AK2 and T-72AK3 which represented the company command version, battalion command version and regiment command version.
T-72AV: ("V" for vzryvnoi – explosive) model with Kontakt-1 explosive reactive armour fitted to hull front and turret.
 T-72M (Ob'yekt 172M-E2, Ob'yekt 172M-E3, Ob'yekt 172M-E4): Soviet export version, similar to the T-72A but with thinner armour and 125 mm D-81T smoothbore tank gun with 44 rounds. It was sold to Iraq and to Syria and was also built in Poland by Bumar-Łabędy. and Czechoslovakia.

 T-72MK (T-72M(K)): Export version of T-72AK. It is a command vehicle for battalion commanders and has additional radio equipment including the R-130M radio, AB-1-P/30-M1-U generator and a TNA-3 navigation system. The main external difference is a 10 m telescopic antenna stowed under the rear of the stowage box during travel. An additional antenna base for this telescopic antenna is mounted on the left side of the turret. Because of the additional equipment the number of rounds for the 125 mm tank gun had to be lowered from 44 to 38. In NATO code the T-72MK was represented by three different designations: T-72MK1, T-72MK2 and T-72MK3 which represented the company command version, battalion command version and regiment command version.
 T-72M-E (Ob'yekt 172M-E): Soviet export version armed with the 125 mm D-81T smoothbore tank gun with 44 rounds.
 T-72M fitted with a French 155 mm F1 turret for trials in India.
 T-72M fitted with a British 155 mm Vickers T6 turret for trials in India.

 T-72M1 (Ob'yekt 172M-E5, Ob'yekt 172M-E6): Soviet export version, with thicker armour and similar to T-72A obr.1979g. It also is fitted with 7+5 smoke grenade dischargers on turret front. It was also built in Poland and ex-Czechoslovakia.
 : Commander's variant with additional radios.
 : T-72M1 with Kontakt-1 explosive reactive armour ("V" for vzryvnoi – explosive).

 T-72M1M (Ob'yekt 172M-E8): Soviet export version. It's a T-72M1 upgraded to T-72B standard. It has the Arena Active Protection System.

 T-72S "Shilden" (T-72M1M1, Ob'yekt 172M-E8): Export version of the T-72B with only 155 ERA bricks, simplified NBC system, no anti-radiation lining etc.
  (Ob'yekt 184) (NATO code: SMT M1988): (1985) (SMT – Soviet Medium Tank)  There is new 2A46M main gun with new 2E42-2 stabilisation system. Much improved version of 1A40-1 fire control system, 1K13-49 gunner's sight for the use of 9M119 Svir anti-tank guided missile through gun barrel. Thicker armour, 20 mm of appliqué armour on the front of the hull , front and top of the turret were heavily reinforced with composite armour better known by its US codename "Super Dolly Parton". New V-84-1 engine with 840 hp (626 kW). On early models the smoke dischargers were mounted on the turret front (as on the T-72A), later they were grouped on the left side of the turret to prepare for the installation of ERA bricks.

 T-72BK (Ob'yekt 184K): Command version of the T-72B, recognisable by having multiple radio antennas and a radio mast stowage under rear turret bin.
 : ("V" for vzryvnoi – explosive) model with Kontakt-1 explosive reactive armour fitted to hull front and turret.

 T-72BA (Ob'yekt 184A/A1): this designation is used to refer to several models of late T-72B, stripped down, refurbished and upgraded with certain core components at Uralvagonzavod between 1998 and 2005. There are several features common to all upgraded T-72BA models; front of the turret and front of the hull reinforced with Kontakt-5 ERA, the frontal floor plate reinforced against mines, the driver's seat is now suspended from the ceiling instead of being fixed to the floor and the driver's station has a new steering system as well as a new TVN-5 night sight. These tanks are equipped with the V-84MS engine using an upgraded exhaust system and newly developed twin-pin tracks (used on the T-90A). The upgrade also included the integration of a DWE-BS wind sensor whose mast is located on the rear, left part of turret and which feeds information into the 1A40 fire control system automatically. Tanks upgraded after the year 2000 received an improved 1A40-01M fire control system which makes use of a TBV digital ballistic computer. The tanks can also fire the 9M119M Refleks laser-guided anti-tank missile through the use of a 1K13-19 sight. The most recent T-72BA tanks made in 2005 feature the latest iteration of the 1A40 FCS, designated 1A40-M2. While the upgraded tanks retained the original 2A46M main gun, more importantly, they received a much improved 2E42-4 stabilization system which significantly improved accuracy – especially during firing on the move. Approximately 750 tanks were upgraded to the T-72BA standard.

 T-72B1 (Ob'yekt 184-1): T-72B without the 9K120 missile system.
 T-72B1K (Ob'yekt 184K-1): Command version of the T-72B1.

 T-72B1MS "White Eagle"(Ob'yekt 184-1MS): T-72B1 modernized by the 61st armour repair factory (today part of the Uralvagonzavod group), first unveiled at the Engineering Technologies 2012 forum, painted all white, hence the unofficial nickname "White Eagle". The protection of the tank is unchanged, with the Kontakt-1 explosive reactive armour being retained, and the cannon is unchanged. A modernised V-84MS engine is installed, but its power output is the same as the older one. An auxiliary power unit is added. The electronics are heavily upgraded, including a rear camera for the driver, a GPS/GLONASS navigation system, a "Falcon's Eye" third generation panoramic thermal sight for the commander, a Sosna-U thermal gunner sight, an automatic target-tracking system, a chassis management system, a meteorological mast, and the capability to use 9M119 Svir/Refleks barrel-launched ATGMs. Lastly, a Kord remotely controlled AA machine gun is added. These improvements increase the weight from 44.1 to 47.3 tonnes. Currently (2019) in service with Laos, Nicaragua and Serbia
 T-72B obr.1989g: T-72B equipped with advanced Kontakt-5 explosive reactive armour, composite armour in sides of turret as well. Often called T-72BM or T-72B(M) but this is not correct. NATO code: SMT M1990.
 T-72B obr.1990g: Additionally fitted with new FCS, crosswind sensor and sometimes V-92S2 engine.
 T-72B obr.1990g with an improved commander's cupola with a larger sight.

 T-72B2 Rogatka obr.2006g (Ob'yekt 184M) (also referred to as T-72BM in documents): T-72B upgrade proposal code-named Rogatka. First shown at the 2006 Russian Arms Expo, it was equipped with a new fire-control system including a Sosna-U thermal sight, and a new 125 mm 2A46M-5 main gun. The autoloader was replaced with the model found on the T-90A, and allowed for the use of longer, more modern ammunition. A new V-92S2 1,000 hp diesel engine was added. The new Relikt third-generation ERA replaced the Kontakt-5 ERA on the front of the tank, while slat armour was added on the flanks. TShU-1-11 laser warning receivers were placed on the turret front. The prototype was shown equipped with the Nakidka camouflage kit. The price of this modernisation was deemed too high, and it was not serially produced. However, some of its features were used in the T-72B3 modernisation package.
 T-90 (Ob'yekt 188) – A further development of the T-72, incorporating many features of the heavier, more complex T-80. It was first called T-72BU.

 (Ob'yekt 184-M3): this upgrade was initiated in 2010 using old stocks of T-72B tanks held in reserve. The purpose was to upgrade old T-72s to use the same gun, ammunition, ATGM, ERA etc. as the new T-90A tanks to simplify supply lines. In addition to performing a general overhaul of every vehicle, all tanks were equipped with the more powerful V-92S2 engines and a new steering system in the driver's compartment, and older tracks were replaced with the new universal, twin-pin design. The upgrade program focuses mainly on the implementation of a new fire control system. The tank commander retains an upgraded version of the legacy TKN-3MK sight, which is a passive device with a range of only 600 m at night. The commander also has a separate monitor that displays thermal imagery from the gunner's main sight, and a new turret control panel. The gunner has the new PNM Sosna-U panoramic multi-spectral sensor, which replaced the TPN-3-49 in its mounting; the 1A40-4 FCS with 1K13-49 sight is retained, but as part of the auxiliary sighting system to complement the newer system. The Sosna-U is a multi-channel, panoramic sight stabilized in both vertical and horizontal axes with a built-in laser rangefinder and command guidance module, used with 9M119M missiles. The main advantage of the Sosna-U is the Thales Catherine-FC thermal imager which extends the detection range of a tank-sized target to 10,500 m and the  identification range to 3,300 m in both day and night conditions and all weathers. The T-72B3 series vehicles also received the new 2A46M-2 main gun which is reportedly equivalent to the Rheinmetall Rh120 L/44 cannon. The gun-laying and stabilization drives were also replaced by the new 2E42-4 system, and the AZ ammunition auto-loader was modified to accommodate newer generations of 125 mm smoothbore anti-tank ammunition: Vant (depleted uranium) and Mango (tungsten) rounds. There is also a new 9K119 Refleks system, used to launch 9M119 Refleks ATGM thorugh the gun barrel. The B3 upgrade includes a new explosion- and fire-suppression system and an advanced VHF radio system designated R-168-25U-2 AKVEDUK. The variant entered service on 19 October 2012. It was first delivered to the 20th Field Army in summer 2013, and to its Armored Guards Brigade in October 2013. About 2,000 such tanks were in service as of 2020. The cost to upgrade a T-72 to the T-72B3  standard was around 52 million rubles in 2013.
T-72B3 obr.2014: a special version of the T-72B3, first seen during the 2014 edition of the Tank Biathlon competition. The most notable upgrades are the stabilized, panoramic, independent PK-PAN commander sight with integrated thermal viewer and a V-92S2 1,000 hp engine.

T-72B3M obr.2016: a further upgrade of the T-72B3, produced since 2016 by overhauling and upgrading old T-72B tanks from storage. The purpose was to use the same gun, ammunition, ATGM, ERA etc. as the T-90 M tank to simplify supply lines. There is a new gun 2A46M-5 with new anti-tank ammunition Svinets-1 (tungsten) and Svinets-2 (depleted uranium). 9K119M Refleks-M system used to launch 9M119M Invar (also called Reflex-M) ATGM through gun barrel. New radio communication. New panoramic sight, rear view camera and GLONASS satellite navigation. Increased protection against mines. New Kalina fire control system, although in simplified form.  The automotive performance of the tank was also improved with a more powerful V-92S2F engine rated at 1,130 hp (830 kW) coupled to an automatic transmission system and improved drivetrain. Protection is improved by Relikt new generation ERA mounted on sides of both hull and turret, while cage armor was added to the rear. Kontakt-5 ERA is retained over the frontal arc and turret top. There is optional Arena-M APS as a "hard kill" active protection. The Russian Defense Ministry ordered several hundred T-72B3M tanks, and received the first twenty in early 2017. The cost to upgrade a T-72 to the T-72B3 obr.2016 standard was around 78.9 million rubles in 2016.
Unmanned version of T-72B3M is (as of December 2018) under development.
T-72B3M obr.2022: It is the most recent upgrade of the T-72B3, based on combat experience gained during the 2022 Russian invasion of Ukraine. The tank is fitted with the same armament as the previous obr. 2016 model, however its protection has been enhanced. Previously, the back of the turret was without any additional protection and now there is new Relikt explosive reactive armour with additional slat (cage) armor in the same region. Lower parts of the turret are covered by a metal net designed to improve protection against rocket-propelled grenades, similar to that of the T-90M. Additional Kontakt-5 blocks installed right and left of the gun mantlet as well as on the turret top. The gun mantlet is also protected by Kontakt-1 ERA. The void in ERA coverage caused by the smoke grenade dischargers on the right side of the turret is now protected by Kontakt-1 ERA. Relikt ERA plates attached along the entire length of the chassis, also in the fender and idler areas. Mechanism to open the armoured protection panels for the Sosna-U sighting system is added, replacing the previous configuration which used bolts that had to be unscrewed manually before combat.

  (Boyevaya Mashina Ognemyochikov) – A transport vehicle for flamethrower-squads armed with RPO launcher. Entered service in 2001.
 BMPT (Ob'yekt 199) – Heavy convoy and close tank support vehicle (Boyevaya Mashina Podderzhki Tankov). All new turret armed with 2x 30 mm 2A42 autocannons (500 rounds), 4x 9M1201 Ataka-T ATGM and 7.62 mm PKT MG (2,000 rounds). It can be also fitted with 2x AGS-30 automatic grenade launchers. Features new fire control system with thermal sights and a ballistic computer. Reinforced with 3rd generation "Relikt" ERA on the frontal armor and both sides of hull and turret, slat (cage) armor in the rear. It is equipped with Agat-MR night vision devices, an NBC detection and protection system. There is 902A "Tucha" 81 mm smoke grenade launcher array on each side of the turret and "Shtora-1" active protection system. When the screening system warns the crew of laser tracking, a smoke screen is created by the launch of grenades. The vehicle can be fitted with either the KMT-8 or the EMT mine clearing system. The term BMP-T that is very often found is not correct.
 TOS-1 – Large box-type multi-barrel rocket launcher with 30 tubes that replaces turret.
 TZM-T – Reloading vehicle for the TOS-1 mobile multi-barrel rocket launcher.
  (Bronirovannaya Remonto-Evakuatsionna Mashina) – Armoured recovery vehicle with a hydraulic crane with capacity of 12 tonnes mounted at the front of the hull on the left side. It also has a main winch with capacity of 25 tons which can be increased to 100 tonnes, auxiliary winch, hydraulically operated dozer/stabilizing blade at the front of the hull, towing equipment and a complete range of tools and recovery equipment.
 IMR-2 (Inzhenernaya Mashina Razgrashdeniya) – Combat engineering vehicle (CEV). It has a telescoping crane arm which can lift between 5 and 11 metric tons and utilizes a pincers for uprooting trees. Pivoted at the front of the vehicle is a dozer blade that can be used in a V-configuration or as a straight dozer blade. When not required it is raised clear of the ground. On the vehicle's rear, a mine-clearing system is mounted.
 IMR-2M1 – Simplified model without the mine-clearing system. Entered service in 1987.
 IMR-2M2 – Improved version that is better suited for operations in dangerous situations, for example in contaminated areas. It entered service in 1990 and has a modified crane arm with bucket instead off the pincers.
 IMR-2MA – Latest version with bigger operator's cabin armed with a 12.7 mm machine gun NSV.
 Klin-1 – Remote controlled IMR-2.

 MTU-72 (Ob'yekt 632) (Tankovyj Mostoukladchik) – bridge layer based on T-72 chassis. The overall layout and operating method of the system are similar to those of the MTU-20 and MTU bridgelayers. The bridge, when laid, has an overall length of 20 meters. The bridge has a maximum capacity of 50,000 kg, is 3.3 meters wide, and can span a gap of 18 m. By itself, the bridge weighs 6400 kg. The time required to lay the bridge is 3 minutes, and 8 minutes for retrieval.
 BMR-3 (Bronirovannaja Mashina Razminirovanija) – Mine clearing vehicle.
 RKhM-7 "Berloga-1" (Razvedivatel'naya Khimicheskaya Mashina) – NBC reconnaissance vehicle without turret and with fixed superstructure.
 Ob'yekt 327 – Self-propelled 152 mm gun. Prototype only.

Belarus
 T-72BM2 - Modernization of the T-72B.

Bulgaria

 T-72M2 – New night vision and thermal devices, anti-radiation cladding, rubber side skirts, C4I and IR suppression coating.
 T-72M1 Mod. 2022 – T-72M1 modernised with Elbit's Thermal Imaging Fire Control System, giving the gunner 3rd generation+ thermal imaging capabilities along with a new laser range finder capable of lasing up to 9 km away. The system also includes a battlefield management system, four laser warning receives, a new fire control system with a metrological sensor, new thermal sleeve for the 2A46 125 mm gun,  and thermal night time cameras for the driver. The T-72M1 Mod. 2022 is also one of the few T-72s to receive an auxiliary power unit (APU) that allows the tank to have a "silent watch" capability, allowing it to operate all its system with the engine turned off to save fuel and reduce the tank's thermal emissions and acoustic signature. The tank was modernised locally at "Terem - Khan Krum" EOOD in Targovishte.

Croatia

 M-84A – The M-84 is a Yugoslav third generation main battle tank, based on the Soviet T-72, produced in Croatian Đuro Đaković specijalna vozila.
 M-84D – Modern upgrade of the M-84A4 with technology developed for M-95 Degman prototype.
 M-95 Degman – 3rd generation prototype tank based on the Yugoslav M-91 Vihor prototype.

Czechoslovakia

 T-72M (Ob'yekt 172M-E3) (1985) – This model was built under licence by ZŤS Martin (nowadays Slovakia). In Western sources it is often referred to as T-72G which might be the designator for the version exported to the Middle East. In the late 1980s the tanks produced for the Czechoslovak army and for export as well were fitted with some improvements from the Soviet T-72A programme, including rubber side skirts (instead of "gill armour") and 902B "Tucha" smoke grenade launchers.

 T-72M1 (Ob'yekt 172M-E5) (1986) – This export version of the T-72A was also built by ZŤS. An external difference with the Soviet original is the reduced number of KMT mounts on the lower glacis plate.
  (vyprošťovací tank) – Czechoslovak armoured recovery vehicle based on T-72 chassis.
  – Czechoslovak ARV based on BREM-1 with dozer blade with prominent rams mounted on the front of the vehicle, hydraulic crane on the right side of vehicle and a large built-up superstructure at the front of the hull with a large tackle block in front of it.

Czech Republic

These variants are not new builds, but upgrades of a large number of otherwise obsolete T-72 version hulls.
 T-72M4CZ (2003) – Comprehensive upgrade of every aspect of the T-72M1 resulting in a tank that only superficially resembles the precursor, intended to remedy T-72's failures learned during the Gulf War. The automotive performance was enhanced with a Perkins CV12-1000 1,000 hp (740 kW) water-cooled diesel engine coupled to a Nimda XTG-411-6 automatic transmission. All drive train work was done by the Israeli firm Nimda and involved minor modifications of the tank's hull and the driver's compartment. The upgrade added new Czech-manufactured Dyna-72 ERA for protection against HEAT and kinetic rounds impacting the frontal aspects of the turret and hull, and against top-attack ATGMs and sub-munitions with ERA tiles covering the turret roof. Survivability is enhanced with the Polish-made Obra laser warning system integrated with a series of DGO-1 smoke grenade dischargers on each side of turret, a Deugra fire suppression system, REDA NBC suite and electromagnetic mine plow. The most important improvement in firepower comes from the use of the Galileo Avionica TURMS-T computerized FCS (similar to that used on the C1 Ariete) which enables a "hunter-killer" mode of operation; the commander has a panoramic day/night sight with built-in laser rangefinder and Attila thermal camera and can engage targets independently, while the gunner has his own primary sight with thermal channel. The FCS has sensors that correct for thermal distortion of the barrel, the temperature of the ammunition propellant, meteorological conditions, totaling 22 sensor clusters installed at several points on the turret. A new 125/EPpSV-97 APFSDS round was developed for use with the new tank which can defeat 540 mm of RHA at 2,000 m. The Czech tanks were also equipped with a rear-view camera, a new intercom, navigational system, the DITA 72/97B auto-diagnostic system and improvements to the suspension due to the increase in the weight of the T-72M4 CZ by 4 tonnes. Curiously, the obsolete 2A46 main gun was retained as was the original 2E28M stabilization system, which was modestly upgraded with new hydraulic drives and gyroscopic sensors, resulting in only marginal improvements in first-hit probability despite the sophisticated and expensive TURMS-T FCS. The published probability of hitting a stationary target on the move is said to be between 65 and 75% with the first fired round. In comparison, the Leopard 2A4 from the mid-1980s can achieve a first round hit probability on the move of 75-85% at 2,000 m and as high as 90% with a skilled crew. The original tender called for an order of 350 tanks, which was downgraded to 140 in the face of dwindling defense budgets and finally amounted to a commitment for only 35 tanks to be upgraded to the T-72M4 CZ standard. One of the reasons for this drastic reduction was due to the escalating unit cost of the upgrade — from an initial estimate of 3.7M—and closing on a final cost of US$5.2M per tank.
  – Modernized VT-72 (BREM-72) ARV with T-72M4CZ upgrades including the power pack and communications upgrades.
This version offers several modernization packages depending on buyer's preferences. These include increased armour protection, better power pack, better protection against WMDs, modern optical and targeting systems, remote control of the external 12,7mm machine gun, new fire-control system, modern communications system, new fire protection system and more.
New opto-electronic devices and an upgraded night vision block for all three crew members from company Optics trade, which significantly improve night vision capabilities and resolution. It uses a laser rangefinder to increase the probability of a first round hit, an improved thermal sight with ballistic computer, an upgraded commander's sight and an upgraded driver's sight. The night vision systems operate fully in passive mode without the use of infrared lights. 
Increased ballistic protection with most vulnerable parts covered with reactive armour, significantly increasing the tank's protection against RPGs and HEAT ammunition. The reactive armour added to the tank is the equivalent of 400 millimetres of rolled armour when hit by a warhead. In total, the tank is equipped with 196 boxes of reactive armour.
Significantly improved mobility due to an upgraded power pack with increased engine power to 840 hp and increased acceleration dynamics.
Complete modernization of driver's position with a new digital dashboard. New internal and external communication systems, digital radio enabling encrypted communication. New fire protection system. Periscopic sights with anti-laser protection.

East Germany

 T-72M – This designator was not only used for the standard T-72M, but also for 75 basic T-72s that were upgraded by RWN in 1986. These tanks (Kampfpanzer) were fitted with rubber side skirts, smoke grenade launchers "Tucha" and the additional 16 mm steel plate on the upper glacis plate.
 T-72M "Übergangsversion" – East-German army designator for 23 late-production T-72Ms from Poland, fitted with the additional hull armour. Delivered in 1986.
 T-72(K) and T-72(K1) – East-German army designators for command tanks (Führungspanzer).
 T-72TK – East German designation for VT-72B (BRAM-72B). The vehicle was planned to enter service with NVA in 1990, but only one was actually handed over to IB-9 (Instandsetzungsbatallion 9) at Drögeheide (Torgelow). Two others were still in Grossenhain (Central tank workshop near Dresden) on 3 October 1990. At this place the tanks got fitted with relevant NVA kit and the cranes were tested/certified.
 BLP 72 (Brückenlegepanzer) – The East-German army had plans to develop a new bridgelayer tank that should have been ready for series production from 1987 but after several difficulties the project was canceled.
 FAB 172M or FAP 172U (Fahrausbildungspanzer) – Driver training vehicle. Three vehicles were made by using the chassis of the cancelled BLP 72 project.

Georgia

 T-72 SIM-1 – Increased implementation of K-1 reactive and K-5 passive armor. New FALCON command and control system, GPS navigation system and Polish SKO-1T DRAWA-T fire control system with thermal imager and laser rangefinder (from PT-91 Twardy). It has also a friend-or-foe recognition system.

India

By the late 1970s, Indian Army HQ had decided to acquire new-generation replacements for its UK-origin fleet of Royal Ordnance Factories-built Centurion and Vijayanta MBTs, which are based on the licensed production of the Vickers MBT, and consequently, paper evaluations concerning the firepower and mobility characteristics of the two principal contenders being offered for full in-country production—AMX-40 developed by GIAT Industries of France, and the Chieftain 800 (which later evolved into the Challenger 1 from Royal Ordnance Factories (then owned by British Aerospace PLC)—were conducted by the Indian Army. Between these two contenders, the Army had by early 1980 zeroed in on the 43-tonne AMX-40 MBT, which was still on the drawing boards and was meant to be powered by a 1,100 hp Poyaud V12X 12-cylinder diesel engine coupled with a LSG-3000 automatic power shift transmission built by RENK Aktiengesellschaft of Germany (offering a power-to-weight ratio of 25.6 hp/tonne, and armed with a 120 mm smoothbore cannon. However, AMX-40 had only marginal protection by the standards of 1980's. After coming back to power, the Indian Prime Minister Indira Gandhi requested additional evaluation, including MBTs from the USSR, following which the Soviet Union's Ministry of Foreign Economic Relations (which after 1991 morphed into Oboronexport, then Rosoboronservice and ultimately Rosoboronexport State Corp) made a formal offer to India's Ministry of Defence (MoD) for supplying the 37-tonne T-72M Ob'yekt 172M-E4 MBT off-the-shelf, and according an approval for licensed-production of the 41.5-tonne T-72M-1982 Ob'yekt 172M-E6 to the MoD-owned Heavy Vehicles Factory (HVF) in Avadi. By early 1981, two T-72Ms—powered by a 780 hp diesel engine, armed with 125 mm 2A46M smoothbore gun and offering a power-to-weight ratio of 20 hp/tonne, were subjected to an exhaustive series of in-country firepower and mobility trials by the Army. After review of trial results, T-72M and T-72-1982 (powered by a Model V-84MS four-stroke 12-cylinder multi-fuel engine developing 840 hp and offering a power-to-weight ratio of 18.8 hp/tone) were selected as Army's future MBTs, and a procurement contract for 2,418 T-72s was subsequently inked.

 Ajeya MK1 – Indian version of the T-72M1. In parallel with buying various T-72M off-the-shelf from the Soviet Union, India also launched its domestic production at Heavy Vehicles Factory.
 Ajeya MK2 – Indian version of the T-72M1 with ERA and banks of 6 smoke grenade-launchers on each side.
 Combat Improved Ajeya (Not to be confused with Ajeya MK2) - For a rather long time the Indian Army did not intend to modernize its T-72 tanks since it was relying on their own tank project the Arjun. However, the Arjun program had been undergoing difficulties. As a result, they adopted the Operation Rhino plan aimed at re-equipping 1,500 T-72M1 tanks. The upgrade program provides for installation of a Polish SKO-1T DRAWA-T fire control system/thermal imager supplied by the Polish PCO/Cenzin (from PT-91 Twardy), DRDO explosive reactive armour, a navigation system from Israel's Tamam, German Litef or South African RDI, a locally developed laser illumination warning system, new radios manufactured by Tadiran or GES Marconi and an improved NBC protection system will be fitted. The tank is planned to be powered by a  S-1000 engine made by the Polish firm PZL-Wola (also from PT-91 Twardy). It is also upgraded with new fire detection and suppression systems and laser warning systems on either side of the turret. Indian sources often say that 1,800–2,000 T-72M1 tanks will be upgraded top to bottom while the rest will undergo only partial improvement.
 Tank EX – Indian integration of the Arjun turret onto the T-72 hull, Prototype only. Did not enter production as it was rejected by the Indian Army.

Iran
T-72M Rakhsh - Iranian T-72M upgrade, equipped with a variant of Kontakt-5 ERA among many upgrades.

Iraq

T-72 Saddam – T-72M modified by Iraq to suit local conditions. Some of the suspension shock absorbers were removed and a searchlight on the right-hand-side of the main armament was added.
Lion of Babylon (Asad Babil) – Iraqi-assembled version of the T-72M1.

Poland
 T-72M/T-72M1 –Licensed, standard T-72 models produced in Poland
 T-72M (Ob'yekt 172M-E3) – This export version of the T-72 was built under licence by Bumar-Łabędy in Gliwice starting in 1982. Like Soviet tanks, the Polish T-72M was initially fitted with "gill" armour; later the tanks were upgraded with rubber side skirts and 902W Tucha smoke grenade launchers. Late production models have an additional 16 mm steel plate welded on the upper glacis plate, like in the T-72M1.
 T-72M1 (Ob'yekt 172M-E5) – This export version of the T-72A was also built under licence in Poland since 1983. The most obvious external difference relative to Soviet analogs is the reduced number of KMT mounting points on the lower hull glacis plate. It is the first version to feature ceramic sand bars "kwartz" rods in the turret cavity and  High Hardness Steel appliqué armor on upper glacis.
 T-72M1D – Polish designation for T-72M1K.
 T-72M1R – Modification of T-72M1.
 Jaguar: When Polish production of the T-72 started in 1982, the Poles considered upgrading them and the first domestic T-72 upgrade program was launched by the Institute of Armament and Equipment of the Polish Army. The project was code-named Jaguar since that was the designation under which the Soviet Union transferred the technical data package for the T-72. The Jaguar was never more than a concept.
 Wilk: Beginning in 1986, the Polish T-72 Wilk project was instituted to allow tank repair plants to upgrade T-72 tanks within their own facilities. In particular, it was proposed that the Soviet-made Volna fire control system be replaced by the Czechoslovak-made Kladivo FCS or by the Polish SKO-1 Mérida, which was originally designed for T-55AM "Merida". Besides the new FCS, the Radomka passive night vision devices were installed in the driver's compartment, as was the Liswarta night sight, Obra laser illumination warning system, Tellur anti-laser smoke grenade launchers, solid or modular metal side skirts and the Polish-developed Erawa-1 or Erawa-2 explosive reactive armour was also fitted. This program was further developed and led to the PT-91.

 PT-91 Twardy – A Polish main battle tank based on T-72M1 developed sometime between the late 1980s and early 1990s and involving use of a new digital fire-control system, newly developed ERA and an uprated powerplant. This formed the basis for a whole line of derivative vehicles. PT-91 was a result of previous T-72 upgrade programs.
 PT-91M Pendekar – Production export variant for Malaysia with Sagem Savan-15 fire control system, a new 1,000 hp powerpack with Renk automatic transmission bringing its top speed to 70 km/h. Its main gun have been changed to a ZTS 2A46MS 125 mm gun, a 7.62 mm FN MAG coaxial machine gun and a 12.7 mm FN Browning M2 HB AA machine gun. This variant is also equipped with Sagem panoramic sight, a Sagem laser gyro inertial navigation system, turret stabilisation system, Obra-3 laser-warning system, integrated with 81 mm smoke grenade launchers, CBRN warning and protection system, Thales communication systems. ERAWA 2 Explosive Reactive Armour, and German-made tank tracks (Diehl Defence). Two prototypes made (renamed PT-91E and PT-91Ex), 48 serial PT-91M Malaj vehicles produced 2007–2009.
 WZT-3 – ARV based on the T-72M. It is armed with a 12.7 mm (1⁄2 in) machine-gun fitted to the commander's hatch. Standard equipment includes: crane with telescopic jib that can lift a maximum load of fifteen tonnes, front-mounted stabilizing dozer blade, main and secondary winches.

 WZT-3M – A PT-91 based variant for Polish Army
 M-84AI – A M-84A based variant, made on licence in Yugoslavia – 15 vehicles for Kuwait
 ARV-3 – A T-72 based variant for Indian Army – 352 vehicles made
 MID Bizon-S – engineering tank based on the PT-91 tank hull
 MID-M – A PT-91M based variant for Malaysian Army
 WZT-4 – Armoured recovery vehicle, PT-91M based variant for Malaysian Army (technically this vehicle is closely related to MID-M, not the WZT-3)
 SJ-09 – Polish driver training vehicle. The turret has been replaced by a flat-plate cabin with dummy gun barrel. Polish army uses T-72 based vehicles, Malaysian Army has one based on PT-91M.
 PZA Loara – SPAAG prototype based on the T-72 chassis.

Romania

 TR-125 – Romanian prototype tank based on T-72 with extra armour, new FCS, new gun, modified suspension and more powerful diesel engine. A reverse engineered vehicle, it was larger in dimensions than the T-72. Its name stands for Tanc Românesc 125 ("Romanian Tank 125"), with "125" indicating the gun caliber of 125 mm.

Serbia 

 Yugoimport T-72 modernization package – Upgraded engine, communication gear and ERA.
 M-84AS – Is a prototype tank using an M-84A tank modernized to T-90 level by Yugoimport SDPR.
 M-84AS1 – Is a substantially modernized version of the M-84 main battle tank
 M-84AI – Armoured recovery vehicle created from the chassis of a M-84A. Completed with the help of Polish experts, resulting in a vehicle similar to the WZT-3. Standard equipment includes: A TD-50 crane, front-mounted stabilizing dozer blade, main and secondary winches.

Slovakia

  – T-72M1 upgraded with suspension of the driver's seat from hull roof, DSM 16.1 engine monitoring system, ERA armour package around the turret with a flat front section, fire detection and suppression system, improved transmission, improved hull floor protection, laser Detection Warning System, modified electrical harness, PNK-72 driver's night sight, SGS-72A commanders stabilized passive sight, gunner's sight with a large head with two section door, S12U diesel engine, Slovenian EFCS3-72A fire control system and MB smoke grenade dischargers on the each side of the turret. It also has two external sensor rod mounts on turret roof.
 T-72M2 – Slovak modernization. Development was completed but without any order for tank fleet modernization.
 VT-72C – Improved VT-72B produced since 1999 for India. It is fitted with a more powerful Polish S-12U diesel engine and has a modified interior.
 VT-72Ž – Combat engineer tank. Similar to the VT-72B but with a modified telescopic arm with bucket.
 MT-72 – Slovakian scissors-type bridge based on T-72 chassis. When deployed the bridge is 20 m long and will span a gap of 18 m. It is capable of carrying loads of up to 50 tonnes.
 ShKH 2000 "Zuzana" (Zuzanne) – A 155 mm (45 calibers) version (the first prototype of which was completed by ZTS in December 1992) of the Dana 152 mm self-propelled gun-howitzer installed on a modified T-72M1 chassis.

South Africa
 T-72 "Tiger" – The modernization package from LIW includes two large sights installed on the front of the turret. South Africa also offers a self-propelled artillery conversion for existing T-72s, rearming the chassis with a turret adopted from the G6 howitzer.

Syria
 T-72 "Adra" – Syrian upgrade featuring slat and spaced armour as extra protection against HEAT.
 T-72M1S – Syrian-Italian upgrade with the addition of the Galileo Avionica TURMS-T computerised FCS, including infrared cameras, improved gun stabilisation, stabilised sights for the gunner and the commander, and capability to launch 9M119 Refleks ATGMs. 124 T-72M1s and T-72AVs were upgraded to this standard between 1998 and 2000. Very few of the upgraded T-72AVs retained their explosive reactive armour after being upgraded.
 Golan-1000 – A rocket system which carries three massive 500 mm rounds, each packed with 500 kg of high-explosive fragmentation ammunition. Built on a T-72 tank chassis, the rocket system has been in use with the Syrian Army since May 2018.

Ukraine

During the invasion by Russia from 2022 Ukrainian forces used captured Russian tanks, including T72s.

 T-72AM "Banan"– unveiled in 1992, the first Ukrainian T-72A upgrade covered extensively with early-generation Kontakt-1 ERA tiles (V-shaped array around the sides of the turret and an array on side skirts). It is powered by the 6TD-1 or 6TD-2 diesel engine (1,250 hp) from the T-84 and features additional smoke grenade launchers.
  – Kharkiv Morozov Machine Building Design Bureau (KMDB) modernization package aimed at improving the automotive and firepower capabilities of the tank with components mostly derived from the T-80UD program, including an improved 6TD-1 engine rated at 1,000 hp or 1,200 hp (881 kW) 6TD-2, new drivetrain components from the T-80UD, an improved engine cooling system, turbocharger and air filter. These upgrades improve upon the T-72B tank's mobility and bring the upgraded vehicle up to par with the T-80UD. Further improvements were made to the fire-control system, which is now an adaptation of the 1A45 Irtysh system, with 1G46 day sight, TKN-4S, TPN-4 or TPN-4 Buran-Catherine night sights (the latter equipped with thermal viewer) which also enables the use of 9M119M Invar laser-guided missiles launched from the main gun. The tank turret was covered in Kontakt-5 ERA tiles and the main gun was upgraded to the newer 2A46M1 variant, and coupled with a significantly more precise 2E42M main gun stabilization system. However, with most of the tank's components reliant upon the T-80UD, this variant has not had any export success.
  – This modernization package was unveiled in 1997 by KMDB and includes an improved 6TD-1 engine, Kontakt-5 or Nizh ERA, a modern fire suppression system and an advanced Sagem SAVAN 15MP fire-control system with the multi-channel thermal SAVAN 15MP (gunner) and panoramic SFIM VS580 (commander) sights. But the capabilities of the FCS were not fully utilized since the tank retained the obsolete 2E42-2 stabilization system and 2A46M main gun. The upgrade is offered jointly with Sagem of France, and PSP Bohemia of the Czech Republic.
  – KMDB main armament package first offered in 1999 with the T-72AG and T-72MP upgrades, which includes an auto-loaded KBM-2 120 mm main gun, developed with the French-based GIAT Industries and capable of firing NATO-standard ammunition or ATGMs. This upgrade includes a new 2E42-M stabilizer and a new auto-loader system housed in the redesigned turret bustle and similar to that used in the Leclerc main battle tank with a capacity of 20 single fixed rounds and further 20 stored in the hull in place of the legacy AZ auto-loading mechanism. The high costs involved with such an extensive modification have thus far driven away potential buyers.
 – A relatively simple upgrade developed for smaller defense budgets of the nations of the developing world, but one that has seen commercial success. The original V-46 engine was replaced with a newer 5TDFMA two-stroke diesel making 1,050 hp (775 kW) and fitted with an enhanced cooling system for use in tropical environments, which allows the tank to be operated for extended periods at temperatures exceeding 55 °C. The tank was also equipped with an EA-10-2 APU with an output of 10 kW, allowing the vehicle's systems to be fully powered when stationary without running the main engine, thus drastically reducing fuel consumption. An air conditioner remains optional. Protection is enhanced with the use of Nizh ERA tiles on the turret while retaining the Kontakt-1 tiles on the hull (however Nizh tiles are compatible with Kontakt-1 mounting points and can be retrofitted). The main gun, stabilizer and FCS remain unchanged compared to the T-72B. Ethiopia purchased the T-72UA1 with 72 tanks delivered in 2011 and 99 in 2012. The Ukrainian army became a customer in 2014 in response to an immediate need following the eruption of the War in Donbass. It is believed that less than 30 vehicles were ordered.
  – Upgraded version of the T-72B ("E" stands for "Export") showed at IDEX 2011 and developed together with the T-64E. The hull front and sides are protected by Kontakt-1 ERA tiles, while the turret front, sides (sides' frontal part) and top are homogeneously protected by Nizh armor. The engine is upgraded, it is a 5TDFMA-1 multi-fuel diesel engine, developing 1050 hp. The tank features also air conditioning, day-and-night sighting system with integrated laser rangefinder and ATGM capability. The weight is 42.7 t, giving the tank a power/weight ratio of 24,6 hp/t.
  – Ukrainian T-72 upgrade. The unique compact design of the Ukrainian-developed BMT-72 power pack, based on that of the T-84, made it possible not only to considerably increase the power capabilities of the vehicle, but also to introduce into the vehicle design a troop compartment. The troop compartment is located between the fighting compartment and the power pack compartment. In the troop compartment roof there is a set of three hatches in slightly raised portion of the hull roof behind turret that allow the troops to get in or dismount the vehicle. There are also steps on the end of each catwalk at rear of vehicle. The main visual difference between BMT-72 and T-72 is a seventh pair of roadwheels.
 BTS-5B – Ukrainian version of the BREM-1.
 T-72AMT – Adapted to fire  laser-guided missiles from its main gun, as well as several other survivability and lethality enhancements.
 T-72EA The Czech Republic supplied the 2022 T-72 Avenger or T-72EA to Ukraine during the Russian invasion that started in 2022. Details of this variant are in the Czech Republic section. Other countries also supplied T-72 and variant tanks.

Yugoslavia
 M-84 – Indigenous main battle tank based on the T-72M but with several upgrades.
 M-84A – Improved version based on the T-72M1, with new SUV-M-84 computerized fire-control system, including the DNNS-2 gunner's day/night sight, with independent stabilization in two planes and integral Laser rangefinder. Other upgrades include a stronger 1,000 hp engine.
 M-84AK – Command version of M-84A fitted with land navigation equipment.
 M-84AB – Export version of M-84A. About 150 were exported to Kuwait.
 M-84ABK – Command version of M-84AB fitted with land navigation equipment.
 M-84ABN – Navigation version of M-84AB fitted with extensive communication equipments, land navigation equipment, and a generator for the command role.

Notes

References
 Sewell, Stephen 'Cookie' (1998).  in Armor vol. 108, no. 4, p. 21. Fort Knox, KY: US Army Armor Center. ISSN 0004-2420. (PDF format)
 Christopher. F. Foss, Jane's Armour and Artillery 2005–2006. .
 Leizin, Uri (2004) "Two myths of one battle: Syrian T-72's in 1982 Lebanon war"(in Russian)
 Zaloga, Steven J (1993) T-72 Main Battle Tank 1974–93, Osprey Publishing .
 Ustyantsev, Sergej Viktorovich; Kolmakov Dmitrij Gennadevich "Boyeviye mashiny Uralvagonzavoda. Tank T-72"
 A.V. Karpenko (1996) "Obozreniye Bronetankovoj Tekhniki (1905-1995 gg.)" Nevskij Bastion
 
Utländska försöksfordon i Sverige | SPHF
När fienden kom till Sverige

Main battle tanks of the Cold War
Cold War tanks of the Soviet Union
Tanks of Finland
Czechoslovakia–Soviet Union relations
Poland–Soviet Union relations
Tanks of Czechoslovakia
Main battle tanks of Poland
Main battle tanks of Slovakia
Main battle tanks of Iraq
T-72
Vehicle operators by vehicle type